This is a list of wildlife found in the Skagit River basin of the Pacific Northwest.

Fish

Salmon and trout
Sockeye salmon
Chinook salmon
Chum salmon
Pink salmon
Coho salmon
Steelhead (coastal rainbow trout)
Coastal cutthroat trout
Dolly Varden trout
Golden trout
Brook trout
Bull trout
Mountain whitefish

Minnows, carp
Peamouth chub
Northern pikeminnow (formerly known as northern squawfish)
Longnose dace
Redside shiner

Suckers
Longnose sucker
Largescale sucker
Bridgelip sucker

Codfishes
Burbot (ling)

Sculpins
Slimy sculpin
Torrent sculpin
Coast range sculpin
Prickly sculpin

Sticklebacks
Three-spined stickleback

Reptiles and amphibians

Turtles
Painted turtle

Lizards
Northern alligator lizard
Western fence lizard
Side-blotched lizard

Snakes
Rubber boa
Western garter snake
Common garter snake
Northwestern garter snake
Racer
Gopher snake

Salamanders
Northwestern salamander
Long-toed salamander
Pacific giant salamander
Rough-skinned newt
Western redback salamander
Van Dyke's salamander
Cope's giant salamander
Olympic salamander
Ensatina

Frogs and toads
Pacific treefrog
Tailed frog
Red-legged frog
Cascades frog
Spotted frog
Bullfrog
Western toad

Mammals

Opossums
Opossum

Shrews
Masked shrew
Vagrant shrew
Dusky shrew
Northern water shrew
Pacific water shrew
Trowbridge's shrew

Moles
Shrew-mole
Coast mole
Townsend's mole

Bats
California myotis
Yuma myotis
Little brown myotis
Long-eared myotis
Long-legged myotis
Hoary bat
Townsend's big-eared bat
Silver-haired bat
Big brown bat

Pikas
Pika

Rabbits and hares 
Eastern cottontail
Snowshoe hare

Mountain beaver
Mountain beaver

Chipmunks, marmots, squirrels 
Yellow-pine chipmunk
Townsend's chipmunk
Hoary marmot
Cascade golden-mantled ground squirrel
Western gray squirrel
Fox squirrel (introduced)
Douglas squirrel
Northern flying squirrel

Beavers
Beaver

Mice, woodrats, voles
Deer mouse
Bushy-tailed woodrat
Red-backed vole
Heather vole
Meadow vole
Townsend's vole
Long-tailed vole
Creeping vole
Water vole
Muskrat
Northern bog lemming
Norway rat (introduced)
Black rat (introduced)
House mouse (introduced)
Pacific jumping mouse

Porcupines
Porcupine

Nutrias
Nutria (introduced)

Coyotes, wolves, foxes
Coyote
Gray wolf (endangered)
Red fox

Bears 
Black bear
Grizzly bear (threatened)

Raccoons
Raccoon

Weasels
Marten
Fisher
Ermine
Long-tailed weasel
Mink
Wolverine
Striped skunk
Western spotted skunk
River otter

Cats
Mountain lion
Lynx
Bobcat

Elk, deer, moose
Elk
Mule deer
White-tailed deer
Moose

Goats
Mountain goats

Birds

Loons
Common loon

Grebes
Pied-billed grebe
Horned grebe
Eared grebe
Western grebe

Herons and bitterns
Great blue heron
Green-backed heron

Swans, geese, ducks
Tundra swan
Trumpeter swan
Snow goose
Canada goose
Wood duck
Mallard
Northern pintail
Green-winged teal
Cinnamon teal
Northern shoveler
Gadwall
American wigeon
Redhead
Ring-necked duck
Greater scaup
Lesser scaup
Harlequin duck
Common goldeneye
Barrow's goldeneye
Bufflehead
Hooded merganser
Red-breasted merganser
Ruddy duck

Raptors
Turkey vulture
Osprey
Bald eagle
Northern harrier
Sharp-shinned hawk
Cooper's hawk
Northern goshawk
Red-tailed hawk
Rough-legged hawk
Golden eagle
American kestrel
Merlin
Peregrine falcon
Prairie falcon

Grouse, ptarmigan, quail
Spruce grouse
Sooty grouse
White-tailed ptarmigan
Ruffled grouse
California grouse (introduced)

Rails and coots
Sora
American coot

 

Shorebirds
Killdeer
Lesser yellowlegs
Greater yellowlegs
Solitary sandpiper
Spotted sandpiper
Pectoral sandpiper
Western sandpiper
Least sandpiper
Dunlin
Baird's sandpiper
Common snipe
Wilson's phalarope
Red-necked phalarope

Gulls and terns
Bonaparte's gull
Mew gull
Ring-billed gull
California gull
glaucous-winged gull
Common tern

Alcids
Marbled murrelet

Pigeons and doves
Rock dove
Band-tailed pigeon
Mourning dove

Owls
Vommon barn owl
Western screech owl
Great horned owl
Mountain pygmy owl
Northern spotted owl
Barred owl
Great grey owl
Long-eared owl
Short-eared owl
Northern saw-whet owl

Nighthawks and swifts
Common nighthawk
Black swift
Vaux's swift

Hummingbirds
Calliope hummingbird
Rufous hummingbird

Kingfishers
Belted kingfisher

 
Woodpeckers
Lewis' woodpecker
Red-breasted sapsucker
Downy woodpecker
Hairy woodpecker
Three-toed woodpecker
Northern flicker
Pileated woodpecker

Flycatchers
Olive-sided flycatcher
Western wood pewee
Willow flycatcher
Hammond's flycatcher
Dusky flycatcher
Say's phoebe
Western kingbird
Eastern kingbird

Larks
Horned lark

Swallows
Tree swallow
Violet-green swallow
Northern rough-winged swallow
Cliff swallow
Barn swallow

Jays, crows, ravens
Canada jay
Steller's jay
Clark's nutcracker
Black-billed magpie
American crow
Common raven

Chickadees, nuthatches, creepers
Black-capped chickadee
Mountain chickadee
Boreal chickadee
Chestnut-backed chickadee
Bushtit
Red-breasted nuthatch
White-breasted nuthatch
Brown creeper

Wrens
Bewick's wren
Marsh wren

Dippers
American dipper

Kinglets
Golden crowned kinglet
Ruby-crowned kinglet

Bluebirds, robins, thrushes
Mountain bluebird
Townsend's solitaire
Veery
Swainson's thrush
Hermit thrush
American robin
Varied thrush

Catbirds
Gray catbird

Pipits 
American pipit

Waxwings
Bohemian waxwing
Cedar waxwing

Shrikes
Northern shrike

Starlings
European starling (introduced)

Vireos 
Solitary vireo
Warbling vireo
Red-eyed vireo

Warblers
Orange-crowned warbler
Nashville warbler
Yellow warbler
Yellow-rumped warbler
Black-throated gray warbler
Townsend's warbler
Hermit warbler
American redstart
Northern waterthrush
MacGillivray's warbler
Common yellowthroat
Wilson's warbler

Tanagers 
Western tanager

Blackbirds, meadowlarks, orioles
Red-winged blackbird
Yellow-headed blackbird
Brewer's blackbird
Western meadowlark
Brown-headed cowbird
Northern oriole

Grosbeaks, buntings, sparrows
Black-headed grosbeak
Lazuli bunting
Spotted towhee
Chipping sparrow
Savannah sparrow
Fox sparrow
Song sparrow
Lincoln's sparrow
Golden-crowned sparrow
White-crowned sparrow
White-throated sparrow
Dark-eyed junco
Rosy finch
Pine grosbeak
Purple finch
House finch
Red crossbill
White-winged crossbill
Common redpoll
Pine siskin
American goldfinch
Evening grosbeak
House sparrow (introduced)

References

Wildlife of the Skagit River Basin
Skagit River